Tahya Tounes (Arabic: تحيا تونس , French: Vive la Tunisie) is a secular party in Tunisia. Youssef Chahed was elected its president on 2 June 2019.

References

2019 establishments in Tunisia
Centrist parties in Tunisia
Destourian parties
Liberal parties in Tunisia
Political parties established in 2019
Political parties in Tunisia
Secularism in Tunisia